Agnes Quaye  (born 5 October 1989) is a Ghanaian footballer who plays as a midfielder for the Ghana women's national football team. She was part of the team at the 2014 African Women's Championship. At the club level, she played for Immigration Accra in Ghana.

References

1989 births
Living people
Ghanaian women's footballers
Ghana women's international footballers
Place of birth missing (living people)
Women's association football midfielders